Tom DeBlass (born May 14, 1982) is an American Brazilian jiu-jitsu practitioner, submission grappler and mixed martial artist currently signed to ONE Championship. He has competed in the middleweight division for Bellator and the Ultimate Fighting Championship.

Background
DeBlass was a county champion long jumper at Central Regional High School, from which he graduated in 2000.  He went on to graduate Monmouth University in 2004 with a degree in Special Education and Elementary Education. DeBlass was known primarily as a Brazilian Jiu-Jitsu competitor winning such titles as Pan American and World Championships. He then fought professionally in Ring Of Combat. In only a year and a half, DeBlass captured two titles and got called up to fight in the UFC. In 2006 DeBlass opened his own Brazilian Jiu-Jitsu Academy "Ocean County Brazilian Jiu-Jitsu".  He has been an instructor to notable BJJ practitioners such as Garry Tonon. He is one of the only people in history to win the North American trials 3 times. In November 2017, Tom was elected as a Lacey Township board of education member.

Mixed martial arts career

Ultimate Fighting Championship
After winning seven straight fights DeBlass was signed by the UFC and made his debut against Cyrille Diabate on one week's notice at UFC on Fuel TV: Gustafsson vs. Silva and lost by Majority Decision.

In his second UFC fight DeBlass dropped down to the Middleweight division to fight against Riki Fukuda at UFC on Fuel TV: Franklin vs. Le He lost by Unanimous Decision.

DeBlass announced his retirement from MMA after the bout with Fukuda stating, "After a lot of talk with my family and coaches, I have decided to retire from fighting and focus on my family, my academy and helping my students to achieve their goals. At this time, I feel it's best for me to give my time to others and spend more time with my family. The drive to keep fighting is not there any longer. I have an amazing academy and feel my students need my full attention."

Bellator MMA
DeBlass returned from his short-lived retirement and made his Bellator debut against Carlos Brooks at Bellator 95 and won by TKO at the end of the second round after the doctor decided that Brooks could not continue.

DeBlass was scheduled to face former IFL Light Heavyweight Champion Vladimir Matyushenko at Bellator 108 on November 15, 2013. However Matyushenko was forced out of the bout due to a broken hand.  DeBlass instead fought fellow UFC veteran Jason Lambert at the event. He won the fight via knockout in the first round.

Tom DeBlass was scheduled to fight Muhammed Lawal on September 5, 2014, at Bellator 123; however, Tom DeBlass suffered a knee injury and was forced off the card. The bout with Lawal was rescheduled for Bellator 131 on November 15, 2014. However, on November 1, it was announced that DeBlass had suffered a cut during training and had to withdraw from the bout.

ONE Championship
On May 17, 2020, DeBlass came out of retirement and signed with ONE Championship.

Personal life
Tom DeBlass runs his own BJJ and MMA gym and has coached numerous students to a high level, including fellow MMA fighter and ADCC veteran Garry Tonon. DeBlass lives in the Forked River section of Lacey Township, New Jersey.

In November 2021, DeBlass released his biography and it quickly became a best-seller in the martial arts biography category on Amazon. In it, he revealed that he had suffered sexual abuse as a child and explained how he was able to overcome that in order to succeed as a BJJ and MMA competitor. DeBlass has also been open about his usage of Testosterone replacement therapy, and is a strong advocate for it.

Philanthropy
DeBlass announced in February 2023 that he was working with other gym-owners across the United States in order to open a non-profit anti-bullying initiative, using Brazilian jiu-jitsu.

Championships and accomplishments

Mixed martial arts
Ring of Combat
ROC Heavyweight Championship (one time)
ROC Light Heavyweight Championship (one time)

Submission grappling
 First person in NJ to win an Adult Black Belt Pan American title
 Second person in NJ history to win ADCC North American Trials
 2007 Brazilian Jiu-Jitsu National Champion
 2007 World Championships Mundials 3rd place Brown Belt 
 2007 No Gi World Champion Brown Belt
 2008 Pan American Champion Brown Belt 
 2009 Abu Dhabi North American Trial Champion 
 2009 Abu Dhabi Combat Club Veteran
 2009 Bronze Medalist No Gi World Champion Black Belt 
 2013 Grapplers Quest National Champ 
 2013 No Gi Pan American Black Belt Ultra Heavy Champion
 2013 No Gi Brazilian Jiu-Jitsu World Championship Bronze medal Super Heavy Black Belt Adult
 2013 Grapplers Quest Worlds Expert Division Ultra heavy Champion
 2014 Professional Grappling League Super Fight Champion (defeated 370 lb Mark Tarmann)
 2014 ADCC NY super fight Champion (defeats Babalu Sobral)
 2014 ADCC North American Champion 99 kg
 2015 Defended The Good Fight Submission only Heavyweight Championship: 206+ lbs Defeated Rodrigo Correia (Submission 60:56)
 2015 Conquest Submission series drew Joao Asiss
 2015 Inducted into NJ Martial Arts hall of fame
 2015 No Gi Brazilian Jiu-Jitsu World Championship Black Belt Ultra Heavy Masters 1 Bronze medal
 2015 No Gi Brazilian Jiu-Jitsu World Championship Black Belt Open Class Masters 1 Champion
 2016 ADCC US Nationals pro absolute champion
 2016 ADCC North American Trials +99 kg Champion
 2017 Fight to Win 30 Main Event Winner over Ricco Rodriguez
 2018 Fight to Win Pro 27 Main Event Winner over Lou Armezzani
 2019 KASAI Pro Superfight Winner

Mixed martial arts record

|-
|Win
|align=center|9–2
|Jason Lambert
|KO (punch)
|Bellator 108
|
|align=center|1
|align=center|1:45
|Atlantic City, New Jersey, United States
| 
|-
|Win
|align=center|8–2
|Carlos Brooks
|TKO (doctor stoppage)
|Bellator 95
|
|align=center|2
|align=center|5:00
|Atlantic City, New Jersey, United States
| 
|-
|Loss
|align=center|7–2
|Riki Fukuda
|Decision (unanimous)
|UFC on Fuel TV: Franklin vs. Le
|
|align=center|3
|align=center|5:00
|Macau, SAR, China
| 
|-
|Loss
|align=center|7–1
|Cyrille Diabate
|Decision (majority)
|UFC on Fuel TV: Gustafsson vs. Silva
|
|align=center|3
|align=center|5:00
|Stockholm, Sweden 
| 
|-
|Win
|align=center|7–0
|Randy Smith
|Submission (heel hook)
|Ring of Combat 39
|
|align=center|1
|align=center|0:41
|Atlantic City, New Jersey, United States
| 
|-
|Win
|align=center|6–0
|David Tkeshelashvili
|Decision (unanimous)
|Ring of Combat 38
|
|align=center|3
|align=center|5:00
|Atlantic City, New Jersey, United States
| 
|-
|Win
|align=center|5–0
|Mike Stewart
|TKO (punches)
|Ring of Combat 37
|
|align=center|1
|align=center|3:07
|Atlantic City, New Jersey, United States
|
|-
|Win
|align=center|4–0
|Sean Salmon
|Submission (achilles lock)
|Ring of Combat 35
|
|align=center|1
|align=center|0:57
|Atlantic City, New Jersey, United States
|
|-
|Win
|align=center|3–0
|Mitch Whitesel
|Decision (unanimous)
| Ring of Combat 33
|
|align=center|3
|align=center|4:00
|Atlantic City, New Jersey, United States
|
|-
|Win
|align=center|2–0
|Tom Velasquez
|TKO (punches)
|Ring of Combat 31
|
|align=center|2
|align=center|0:50
|Atlantic City, New Jersey, United States
| 
|-
|Win
|align=center|1–0
|J.A. Dudley
|Decision (unanimous)
|Ring of Combat 30
|
|align=center|2
|align=center|4:00
|Atlantic City, New Jersey, United States
|

References

External links
 
 

1982 births
Living people
Central Regional High School alumni
Middleweight mixed martial artists
Light heavyweight mixed martial artists
Mixed martial artists utilizing Brazilian jiu-jitsu
American male mixed martial artists
American practitioners of Brazilian jiu-jitsu
People awarded a black belt in Brazilian jiu-jitsu
Monmouth University alumni
People from Berkeley Township, New Jersey
Sportspeople from Lacey Township, New Jersey
Ultimate Fighting Championship male fighters